Qin was an ancient Chinese state during the Zhou dynasty. Traditionally dated to 897 BC, it took its origin in a reconquest of western lands previously lost to the Rong; its position at the western edge of Chinese civilization permitted expansion and development that was unavailable to its rivals in the North China Plain. Following extensive "Legalist" reform in the fourth century BC, Qin emerged as one of the dominant powers of the Seven Warring States and unified the seven states of China in 221 BC under Qin Shi Huang. It established the Qin dynasty, which was short-lived but greatly influenced later Chinese history.

History

Founding

According to the 2nd century BC historical text Records of the Grand Historian by Sima Qian, the Qin state traced its origin to Zhuanxu, one of the legendary Five Emperors in ancient times.  One of his descendants, Boyi, was granted the family name of Yíng by Emperor Shun. During the Xia and Shang dynasties, the Yíng clan split in two: a western branch in that migrated across the Ordos Plateau to Quanqiu (犬丘 or "Hill of the Quanrongs" in present-day Lixian in Gansu), and an eastern branch that settled east of the Yellow River in modern Shanxi. The latter became the ancestors of the rulers of the later Zhao state.

The western Yíng clan at Quanqiu were lords over the Xichui ("Western March") region west of Mount Long and served as a buffer state for the Shang dynasty against invasions by the Western Rong barbarians. One of them, Elai, was killed defending King Zhou of Shang during the rebellion led by Ji Fa that established the Zhou dynasty. The Yíng clan was however allied with the politically influential marquesses of Shen, whom the Zhou monarch relied upon heavily to manage the Rong people, and was thus allowed to retain their lands and continued serving as an attached vassal under the Zhou dynasty.  Feizi, a younger son of Elai's fourth-generation descendant Daluo, impressed King Xiao of Zhou so much with his horse breeding skills, that he was awarded a separate fief in the valley of Qin (present-day Qingshui and Zhangjiachuan County in Gansu) northeast of Quanqiu, and his seat was named Qinyi (in present-day Qintingzhen, Qingshui County). Both branches of the western Yíng clan lived in the midst of the Rong tribes, sometimes fighting their armies and sometimes intermarrying with their kings.

It has been suggested by scholars such as Annette Juliano and Arthur Cotterel that having a horse-breeder as their ancestor may imply that the Yíng family had a partial connection to nomadic tribes. As late as 266 BC, it was remarked by a noble of Wei that they shared customs with the Rong and Di tribes; the Central Plains states seemed to hold Qin culture and other peripheral states like Yan and Chu in low regard, due to the marginal location of their states.  Qin was the second state after Zhao to adopt cavalry tactics from the nomads.  Following the collapse of Zhou Dynasty, the Qin state absorbed cultures from two of the Four Barbarians from the west and north, which made the other warring states see their culture in low esteem. However, the Qin state was sensitive to the cultural discrimination by the Central Plains states and attempted to assert their Huaxia identity. This could be seen in an unusual statute of Qin Law, where mixed-ethnicity offsprings were all categorised as Huaxia, as well as in their preference for importing recruits from the neighbouring state of Jin.

In 842 BC, the nobles revolted against the corrupt King Li of Zhou in a coup known as the "Countrymen's Riot" (國人暴動), overthrowing him the following year, and the country subsequently fell into political turmoil.  The Xirong tribes used the opportunity to rebel against the Zhou dynasty, attacking and exterminating the senior branch of Yíng clan at Quanqiu, leaving the cadet branch at Qinyi the only surviving Yíng clan in the west.  After King Xuan of Zhou ascended the throne in 827 BC, he made Qin Zhong, Feizi's great-grandson, the commander of his forces in the campaign against Xirong.  Two years later in 822 BC, Qin Zhong was killed in battle and was succeeded by his eldest son Duke Zhuang. To commemorating Qin Zhong's loyalty, King Xuan summoned Duke Zhuang and his four younger brothers and gave them 7,000 soldiers.  The Qin brothers successfully defeated the Rong and recovered their lost patrimony formerly held by the deceased branch of Yíng clan, and King Xuan formally awarded them the territory of Quanqiu.  Duke Zhuang then moved his seat from Qinyi to Quanqiu, and had three sons.  When he died in 778 BC, his eldest son Shifu wanted to stay fighting the Xirong and avenge their grandfather, turning down the succession, so his second son Duke Xiang ascended as the clan leader.  Soon afterwards in 777 BC, Duke Xiang married his younger sister Mu Ying to a Rong leader called King Feng (豐王), in an apparent attempt to make peace.  The following year he moved the Qin capital eastward from Quanqiu to Qian (汧, in present-day Long County, Shaanxi), but Quanqiu soon fell to the Rong again after he left.  His older brother Shifu, who led the defence of Quanqiu, was captured by the Rong but was released a year later.

In 771 BC, the Marquess of Shen collaborated with the Zeng state and the Quanrong nomads, attacked and sacked the Zhou capital Haojing, killing King You of Zhou and ending the Western Zhou dynasty.  Duke Xiang led his troops to escort King You's son King Ping to Luoyi, where the new capital city of the Eastern Zhou dynasty was established.  In gratitude of Duke Xiang's service, King Ping formally enfeoffed Duke Xiang as a feudal lord and elevated Qin from an "attached state" (附庸 fùyōng, a minor state with limited self-rule under the authority of another liege lord) to a major vassal state with full autonomy, and further promised to permanently grant Qin the lands west of Qishan, the former heartland of Zhou, if Qin could expel the Rong tribes that were occupying it.  The following generations of Qin rulers were encouraged by this promise, and they launched several military campaigns against the Rong, eventually expanding their territories far beyond the original lands lost by the Western Zhou dynasty.  The Qin state therefore viewed the Zhou rulers King Wen and Wu as their predecessors, and themselves as the legitimate inheritors of their legacy.

Spring and Autumn period

Because their main concern was the Rongs to the west, Qin's interaction with other states in central China remained minimal throughout the Spring and Autumn period (722–481BC), except with its immediate eastern neighbour Jin, a large vassal of the Zhou. Qin maintained good diplomatic relations with Jin through intermarriages between the royal clans, but relations between both sides had also deteriorated to the point of armed conflict on occasions.

During the early reign of Duke Mu of Qin, the Jin state was a formidable power under the leadership of Duke Xian of Jin. However, after the death of Duke Xian, Jin plunged into a state of internal conflict as Duke Xian's sons fought over the succession. One of them won the contention and became Duke Hui of Jin, but Jin was struck by a famine not long later in 647 BC and Duke Hui requested aid from Qin.  Out of goodwill due to his marriage to Duke Hui's half-sister, Duke Mu sent relief food supplies and agricultural equipment to Jin. However, when Qin was struck by famine the next year, Duke Hui refused to reciprocate with help, leading to the diplomatic deterioration between Qin and Jin and a war breaking out in 645 BC, which ended with Duke Hui being defeated and captured. Duke Mu later released him back to Jin after the latter agreed to cede land and sign an alliance.

During the battles with Jin, Duke Mu overheard that one of Duke Xian's exiled sons, Chong'er, was taking refuge in the Chu state. After consulting his subjects, Duke Mu sent an emissary to Chu to invite Chong'er over, and supported him in his challenge and eventual defeat of his brother Duke Hui. After Chong'er become the new ruler of Jin as Duke Wen, he was more grateful to Duke Mu and relations between the two states improved.  With his eastern front stable, Duke Mu used the opportunity to launch military campaigns against the Rong tribes in the west.

In 630 BC, Qin and Jin agreed to wage war on the state of Zheng, but Duke Mu was lobbied by the Zhen emissary to abandon the alliance.  In 627 BC, Duke Mu planned a secret attack on Zheng, but the Qin army retreated after being tricked into believing that Zheng was already prepared for Qin's invasion. By that point Duke Wen had died and his personal alliance with Duke Mu no longer stood, and his successor Duke Xiang ordered an ambush for the retreating Qin army.  The Qin forces were defeated at the Battle of Xiao (near present-day Luoning County, Henan) and suffered heavy casualties, and all three of its generals were captured. Three years later, Qin attacked Jin for revenge and scored a major victory. Duke Mu refused to advance further east after holding a posthumous funeral service for those killed in action at the Battle of Xiao, and went back to focus on the traditional policy of expanding Qin's dominance in the west.  Duke Mu's achievements in Qin's western campaigns and his handling of foreign relations with Jin earned him a position among the Five Hegemons of the Spring and Autumn period.

In 506 BC, King Helü of Wu defeated Chu in the Battle of Boju and captured the Chu capital Ying (present day Jingzhou).  Helü's advisor Wu Zixu, who was previously forced into exile by the already deceased King Ping of Chu and craved vengeance for the brutal execution of his father and brother, exhumed the King Ping's corpse and lashed it posthumously.  This was a great humiliation for the Chu state, so Shen Baoxu, a Chu official and a former friend of Wu Zixu, travelled to the Qin court and pleaded for assistance from Duke Ai of Qin to recover the capital.  After Duke Ai initially refused to help, Shen spent seven days crying in the palace courtyard, and Duke Ai was eventually moved by his devotion and agreed to send troops to assist Chu.  The famous poem named "No Clothes", recorded in the Classic of Poetry, was a battle hymn personally composed by Duke Ai to boost the morale of the Qin troops.  In 505 BC, the Qin and Chu armies jointly defeated Wu in several battles, allowing King Zhao of Chu to be restored and return to the recaptured capital.

Warring States Period

Early decline
During the early Warring States period, as its neighbours in the Central Plains began rapidly developing, Qin was still in a state of underdevelopment and decline.  The Wei state, formed from the Partition of Jin, became the most powerful state on Qin's eastern border.  Qin mostly relied on natural defenses such as the Hangu Pass (函谷關; northeast of present-day Lingbao, Henan) and Wu Pass (武關, in present-day Danfeng County) in the east, to protect its Guanzhong heartland.  Between 413 and 409 BC during the reign of Duke Jian of Qin, the Wei army led by Wu Qi, with support from Zhao and Han, attacked Qin and conquered some Qin territories west of the Yellow River.

Legalist reforms

After suffering losses in the battles with rival states such as Wei, the Qin rulers actively pursued legal, economic social reforms. When Duke Xiao came to the throne of Qin, he issued an announcement calling forth men of talent (including scholars, administrators, theorists and militarists) from other states to enter Qin and help him with his reforms, promising rewards of high offices and lands in return.

Among these foreign talents, Shang Yang successfully conducted a series of Legalist reforms in Qin with the support of Duke Xiao, despite facing strong opposition from conservative Qin politicians. Direct primogeniture was abolished, with all commoners granted citizenship rights. Many were resettled in new clusters focusing on increasing agricultural output. Meritocracy was practised throughout, especially in the military, with soldiers and officers receiving due rewards according to their contributions, regardless of their backgrounds. However, tough and strict laws were imposed as well, with draconian punishments being meted out for the slightest of offences, and even the nobility and royalty were not spared. After decades, the reforms strengthened Qin economically and militarily, and transformed it into a highly centralized state with an efficient administrative system.

After Duke Xiao's death, King Huiwen became the new ruler of Qin and he put Shang Yang to death by chariot-tearing on charges of treason, but some believed that the king harboured a personal grudge against Shang because he was harshly punished for a minor infraction in his adolescence under Shang's reformed system. However, King Huiwen and his successors retained the reformed systems and they helped to lay the foundation for Qin's eventual unification of China under the Qin Dynasty in 221 BC. Shang Yang's theories were further elaborated later by Han Fei, another Legalist scholar who combined Shang's ideas with those of Shen Buhai and Shen Dao, that would form the core of the philosophies of Legalism. Qin rose to prominence in the late third century BC after the reforms and emerged as one of the dominant superpowers of the Seven Warring States.

Ascendancy
Qin's power continued growing in the following century after Shang Yang's reform, owing the success to the industriousness of its people. The Qin kings authorized many state development projects, including large public works such as irrigation canals and defensive structures.

One of the most obvious results of the reforms was the change in Qin's military. Previously, the army was under the control of Qin's nobles and comprised feudal levies. After Shang Yang's reforms, the aristocracy system was abolished and replaced by one based on meritocracy, in which ordinary citizens had equal opportunities as the nobles to be promoted to high ranks. In addition, military discipline was strongly enforced and the troops were trained to adapt better to different battle situations. Qin's military strength increased largely with the full support of the state. In 318 BC, the states of Wei, Zhao, Han, Yan and Chu formed an alliance and attacked Qin, but did not manage to advance beyond Hangu Pass, and were defeated by counter-attacking Qin forces. The alliance crumbled due to mistrust and suspicion and lack of coordination among the five states.

Apart from the effects on Qin's military, Shang Yang's reforms also increased labour for numerous public works projects aimed at boosting agriculture, and made it possible for Qin to maintain and supply an active military force of more than a million troops. This feat could not be accomplished by any other state, except Chu, during that time. Qin's conquests of the southern states of Ba and Shu in present-day Sichuan province also provided Qin with major strategic advantages. The lands in the new territories were very fertile, and helped serve as a "backyard" for supplies and additional manpower. It was hard for Qin's rivals to attack Ba and Shu, since the territories were located deep in the mountains upstream of the Yangtze River. At the same time, Qin's strategic position in Ba and Shu provided it with a platform for launching attacks on the Chu state, which lies downstream of the Yangtze.

Actions against Chu

During the reign of King Huiwen of Qin, the Chu state to the southeast became a target for Qin's aggression. Although Chu had the largest operation-ready army of all the Seven Warring States at over a million troops , its administrative and military strength was plagued by corruption and divided among the nobles. Zhang Yi, a Qin strategist, suggested to King Huiwen to exercise Qin's interest at the expense of Chu. Over the following years, Zhang engineered and executed a number of diplomatic plots against Chu, supported by the constant military raids on Chu's northwestern border. Chu suffered many defeats in battles against Qin and was forced to cede territories to Qin. King Huai I of Chu was furious and ordered a military campaign against Qin, but he was tricked by Zhang Yi into breaking diplomatic ties with his allies, and his angered allies joined Qin in inflicting a crushing defeat on Chu. In 299 BC, King Huai I was tricked into attending a diplomatic conference in Qin, where he was captured and held hostage until his death. In the meantime, Qin launched several attacks on Chu and eventually sacked the Chu capital city of Chen (陳; present-day Jiangling County, Hubei province). The crown prince of Chu fled east and was crowned King Qingxiang of Chu in the new capital city of Shouchun (壽春; present-day Shou County, Anhui province).

Wars against Zhao, Han, and Wei

In the next five decades after King Huiwen's death, King Zhaoxiang of Qin shifted his attention to the Central Plains after the victories in the south against Chu. In the early years of King Zhaoxiang's reign, the Marquis of Rang (穰侯) served as Qin's chancellor and actively pushed for military campaigns against the Qi state in the far eastern part of China. However, the marquis had personal motives, intending to use Qin's powerful military to gain his own fief in Qi territories, since the lands were not directly linked to Qin and would not be under the Qin government's direct administration.

King Zhaoxiang's foreign advisor Fan Sui advised the king to abandon those fruitless campaigns against distant states. King Zhaoxiang heeded this advice and changed Qin's foreign policy to adopting good diplomatic relations with distant states (Yan and Qi), while concentrating on attacking nearby states (Zhao, Han and Wei). As a consequence, Qin began to launch constant attacks on Han and Wei over the next decades, conquering several territories in its campaigns. By then, Qin's territories had expanded to beyond the eastern shore of the Yellow River and Han and Wei were reduced to the status of "buffers" from Qin for the other states in the east.

Starting from 265 BC, Qin launched a massive invasion on Han and forced Han to cede its territory of Shangdang (上黨; in present-day Shanxi province). However, Han offered Shangdang to Zhao instead, which led to a conflict between Qin and Zhao for control of Shangdang. Qin and Zhao engaged in the three-year-long Battle of Changping, followed by another three-year siege by Qin on Zhao's capital city of Handan. The conflict at Changping was deemed as a power struggle, as both sides pitted their forces against each other not only on the battlefield, but also in the domestic context. Although Qin had an abundance of resources and vast manpower, it had to enlist every man above the age of 15 for war-related duties, ranging from front-line service to logistics and agriculture. King Zhaoxiang even personally directed his army's supply lines. The extent of mobilization and the exhaustion in the aftermath was not seen in world history for another 2,000 years, until this concept of total war re-entered the stage during World War I. Qin's eventual victory in 260 BC was attributed to its use of schemes to stir up internal conflict in Zhao, which led to the replacement of Zhao's military leaders.

Following the Qin victory at the Battle of Changping, the Qin commander Bai Qi ordered the 400,000 prisoners-of-war from Zhao to be executed by burying them alive. Subsequently, the Qin forces marched on the Zhao capital city of Handan in an attempt to conquer Zhao completely. However, the Qin troops were unable to capture Handan as they were already exhausted and also because the Zhao forces put up fierce resistance. King Xiaocheng of Zhao offered six cities to Qin as a peace offer and King Zhaoxiang of Qin accepted the offer after being persuaded by Fan Sui. Within Zhao, many officials strongly opposed King Xiaocheng's decision to give up the cities and subsequent delays caused the siege on Handan to be prolonged until 258 BC. Meanwhile, Bai Qi was consecutively replaced by Wang Xi, Wang Ling and Zheng Anping as the Qin commander at the siege.

In 257 BC, Qin was still unable to penetrate Handan after besieging it for three years, and Zhao requested aid from the neighbouring states of Wei and Chu. Wei was hesitant to help Zhao initially, but launched an attack on Qin after seeing that Qin was already exhausted after years of war. The Qin forces crumbled and retreated and Zheng Anping surrendered. The combined forces of Wei and Chu continued to pursue the retreating Qin army and Wei managed to retake part of its original lands that were lost to Qin earlier.

Infrastructural works
In the middle of the third century BC, Zheng Guo, a hydraulic engineer from the Han state, was sent to Qin to advise King Zhaoxiang of Qin on constructing irrigation canals. Qin had a penchant for building large-scale canals, as evident from its Min River irrigation system. King Zhaoxiang approved Zheng Guo's idea on constructing an even bigger canal. The project was completed in 264 BC and the canal was named after Zheng. Qin benefitted from the project as it became one of the most fertile states in China due to the good irrigation system, and also because it could now raise more troops as a consequence of increased agricultural yield.

Unification

In 247 BC, the 13-year-old Ying Zheng became king of Qin after the sudden death of King Zhuangxiang. However, Ying Zheng did not wield state power fully in his hands until 238 BC, after eliminating his political rivals Lü Buwei and Lao Ai. Ying formulated a plan for conquering the other six states and unifying China with help from Li Si and Wei Liao.

In 230 BC, Qin attacked Han, the weakest of the Seven Warring States, and succeeded in conquering Han within a year. Since 236 BC, Qin had been launching several assaults on Zhao, which had been devastated by its calamitous defeat at the Battle of Changping three decades ago. Although Qin faced strong resistance from the Zhao forces, led by general Li Mu, it still managed to defeat the Zhao army by using a ploy to sow discord between King Qian of Zhao and Li Mu, causing King Qian to order Li Mu's execution and replace Li with the less competent Zhao Cong. Zhao eventually fell to Qin in 228 BC after the capital city of Handan was taken. However, a Zhao noble managed to escape with remnant forces and proclaim himself king in Dai. Dai fell to Qin six years later.

After the fall of Zhao, Qin turned its attention towards Yan. Crown Prince Dan of Yan sent Jing Ke to assassinate Ying Zheng but the assassination attempt failed and Qin used that as an excuse to attack Yan. Yan lost to Qin at a battle on the eastern bank of the Yi River in 226 BC and King Xi of Yan fled with remnant forces to Liaodong. Qin attacked Yan again in 222 BC and annexed Yan completely. In 225 BC, the Qin army led by Wang Ben invaded Wei and besieged Wei's capital city of Daliang for three months. Wang directed the waters from the Yellow River and the Hong Canal to flood Daliang; King Jia of Wei surrendered and Wei was conquered.

In 224 BC, Qin prepared for an attack on Chu, its most powerful rival among the six states. During a discussion between Ying Zheng and his subjects, the veteran general Wang Jian claimed that the invasion force needed to be at least 600,000 strong, but the younger general Li Xin thought that 200,000 men would be sufficient. Ying Zheng put Li Xin in command of the Qin army to attack Chu. The Chu defenders, led by Xiang Yan, took Li Xin's army by surprise and defeated the Qin invaders. The defeat was deemed as the greatest setback for Qin in its wars to unify China. Ying Zheng put Wang Jian in command of the 600,000 strong army as he had requested and ordered Wang to lead another attack on Chu. Wang scored a major victory against the Chu forces in 224 BC and Xiang Yan was killed in action. The following year, Qin pushed on and captured Chu's capital city of Shouchun, bringing an end to Chu's existence. In 222 BC, the Qin army advanced southward and annexed the Wuyue region (covering present-day Zhejiang and Jiangsu provinces).

By 221 BC, Qi was the only rival state left. Qin advanced into the heartland of Qi via a southern detour, avoiding direct confrontation with the Qi forces on Qi's western border and arrived at Qi's capital city of Linzi swiftly. The Qi forces were taken by surprise and surrendered without putting up resistance. Following the fall of Qi in 221 BC, China was unified under the rule of Qin. Ying Zheng declared himself "Qin Shi Huang" (meaning "First Emperor of Qin"), founded the Qin Dynasty, and became the first sovereign ruler of a united China.

Culture and society

Before Qin unified China, each state had its own customs and culture. According to the Yu Gong or Tribute of Yu, composed in the fourth or fifth century BC and included in the Book of Documents, there were nine distinct cultural regions of China, which are described in detail in this book. The work focuses on the travels of the titular sage, Yu the Great, throughout each of the regions. Other texts, predominantly military, also discussed these cultural variations.

One of these texts was The Book of Master Wu, written in response to a query by Marquis Wu of Wei on how to cope with the military threat posed by competing states. Wu Qi, the author of the work, declared that the government and nature of the people were reflective of the terrain they live in. Of Qin, he said:

According to Wu, the nature of the people is a result of the government, which is in turn a result of the roughness of the terrain. Each of the states is expounded upon by Wu in this manner.

Following a visit to Qin in 264 BC, the Confucian philosopher Xun Kuang noted that Qin society was "simple and unsophisticated" and their people stood in awe of their officials, but was completely devoid of Confucian literati. Though disliked by many Confucians of its time for "dangerously lacking in Confucian scholars," Confucian Xun Kuang wrote of the later Qin that "its topographical features are inherently advantageous," and that its "manifold natural resources gave it remarkable inherent strength. Its people were unspoiled and exceedingly deferential; its officers unfailingly respectful, earnest, reverential, loyal, and trustworthy; and its high officials public-spirited, intelligent, and assiduous in the execution of the duties of their position. Its courts and bureaus functioned without delays and with such smoothness that it was as if there were no government at all."

In his Petition against driving away foreigners (諫逐客書), Li Si mentioned that guzheng and percussion instruments made of pottery and tiles were characteristic of Qin music.

Rulers

List of Qin rulers based on the Records of the Grand Historian by Sima Qian, with corrections by Han Zhaoqi:

In popular culture

The events during the reigns of Duke Xiao, King Huiwen, King Wu and King Zhaoxiang are romanticised in a series of historical novels by Sun Haohui. The novels are adapted into the television series The Qin Empire (2009), The Qin Empire II: Alliance (2012) and The Qin Empire III (2017).

The Japanese manga "Kingdom," by Hara Yasuhisa, tells a fictionalised story of the life of Qin Shi Huang and the unification of China with some references to the era of Duke Mu.

A Step into the Past tells about a 21st-century Hong Kong VIPPU officer who travels back in time to the Warring States period of ancient China. He is involved in a number of important historical events that leads to the first unification of China under the Qin dynasty. The series' first original broadcast ran from 15 October to 7 December 2001 on the TVB Jade network in Hong Kong.

Qin in astronomy
Qin is represented by two stars, Theta Capricorni and 30 Capricorni, in Twelve States asterism. Qin is also represented by the star Delta Serpentis in asterism Right Wall, Heavenly Market enclosure (see Chinese constellation).

References

Citations

Sources 

 
 
 Watson, Burton. (1993). Records of the Grand Historian by Sima Qian. Translated by Burton Watson. Revised Edition. Columbia University Press. .
 Li Si. ( BC). Petition against driving away foreigners (《諫逐客書》).

 
Ancient Chinese states
States and territories established in the 9th century BC
9th-century BC establishments in China
221 BC
States and territories disestablished in the 3rd century BC
3rd-century BC disestablishments
1st-millennium BC disestablishments in China
Former monarchies